Rachicerus obscuripennis is a North American Diptera of the Rachicerinae family. It is the only  North American  species with pectinate (comblike) flagellomeres (antenna segments).

Distribution
United States.

References

Xylophagidae
Insects described in 1863
Taxa named by Hermann Loew
Diptera of North America